Academic personnel, also known as faculty member or member of the faculty (in North American usage) or academics or academic staff (in British, Australia, and New Zealand usage), are vague terms that describe teachers or research staff of a school, college, university or research institute. In British and Australian/New Zealand English "faculty" usually refers to a sub-division of a university (usually a group of departments), not to the employees, as it can also do in North America. Universities, community colleges and even some secondary and primary schools use the terms faculty and professor. Other institutions (e.g., teaching hospitals or not-for-profit research institutes) may likewise use the term faculty.  

The higher education regulatory body of India, University Grants Commission, defines academic staff as teachers, librarians, and physical education personnel.

In countries like the Philippines, faculty is used more broadly to refer to teaching staff of either a basic or higher education institution.

Overview

In many universities, the members of the administration (e.g., department chairs, deans, vice presidents, presidents, and librarians) are also faculty members; many of them begin (and remain) as professors. At some universities, the distinction between "academic faculty" and "administrative faculty" is made explicit by the former being contracted for nine months per year, meaning that they can devote their time to research (and possibly be absent from the campus) during the summer months, while the latter are contracted for twelve months per year. These two types of faculty members are sometimes known as "nine-month faculty" and "twelve-month faculty". Faculty who are paid a nine-month salary are typically allowed to seek external funds from grant agencies to partially or fully support their research activities during the summer months.

Librarians are a special case in that they are educators like faculty who belong to degree granting departments, not necessarily administrators who have management responsibilities like Deans, Presidents, and Vice Presidents. 

Most university faculty members hold a Ph.D. or equivalent highest-level degree in their field. Some professionals or instructors from other institutions who are associated with a particular university (e.g., by teaching some courses or supervising graduate students) but do not hold professorships may be appointed as adjunct faculty.

In North America, faculty is a distinct category from staff, although members of both groups are employees of the institution in question.  This is distinct from, for example, the British (and European, Australia, and New Zealand) usage, in which all employees of the institution are staff either on academic or professional (i.e. non-academic) contracts.

See also
 List of academic ranks
 Tenure

References

Academic terminology